LMS diesel shunter 7050 is an experimental 0-4-0 diesel-mechanical shunting locomotive, introduced by the London Midland and Scottish Railway (LMS) in 1934 and which remained in service with that railway for six years. It was later acquired for military use and is now preserved at the National Railway Museum.

History
No. 7050 was an experimental locomotive built by the Drewry Car Co. at the English Electric Preston works in 1934. It carried an original number of 7400 only within the works and was delivered as LMS number 7050. For six years it was used for dock shunting at Salford before being loaned to the Air Ministry in 1940. It was withdrawn from LMS stock in March 1943 and sold to the War Department (WD) which numbered it 224. Subsequent renumberings by the WD, and later the Army, saw it carry numbers 70224 (in 1944), 846 (1952) and 240 (1968).

At some point it was rebuilt with a Gardner engine and was used at the Royal Navy base at Botley, Hampshire.

Preservation
No 7050 was preserved in 1979, and displayed at the Museum of Army Transport in Beverley. Upon the closure of that Museum in 2003 it was transferred to the National Railway Museum in York.

Footnotes

References

 

7050
Diesel 7050
War Department locomotives
B locomotives
Railway locomotives introduced in 1934
Standard gauge locomotives of Great Britain